The Meschio Railway Bridge is a riveted railway bridge built in 1918. It is located on the Venice–Udine railway, in the northeast of Italy. The 1918 structure was taken out of service in 2006, then dismantled. The main beams were taken to the Structural Laboratory of Padua University for engineering studies.

Technical Details
The main horizontal structure has a  net span. The railway track over the bridge was composed of wooden beams recessed between coupled girders, with each twinned girder supporting the wooden elements that held a single rail.

References 

Railway bridges in Italy
Former railway bridges
Former bridges in Italy